Harry Augustus Guy (4 June 1881 – 23 December 1960) was an Australian rules footballer who played with South Melbourne in the Victorian Football League (VFL).

Football
Recruited from North Launceston, Guy made four appearances for South at the start of the 1903 season before returning to Tasmania by the middle of the year.

Notes

References
 South Melbourne Team, Melbourne Punch, (Thursday, 4 June 1903), p.16.

External links 

1881 births
1960 deaths
Australian rules footballers from Tasmania
Sydney Swans players
North Launceston Football Club players